State Highway 98 (SH 98) is a New Zealand State Highway connecting the settlements of Lorneville (on  just north of Invercargill) and Dacre (on ) in the Southland region. Also known as Lorne Dacre Road, the highway was gazetted in 1997 and provides an indirect northern bypass of the city of Invercargill. The road is very flat and passes through primarily prime agricultural land. One locality, Rakahouka, lies halfway along the route.

See also
 List of New Zealand state highways

References

External links
New Zealand Transport Agency

98
Transport in Southland, New Zealand